The 1974 season was the Minnesota Vikings' 14th in the National Football League (NFL). They won the NFC Central with a 10–4 record, before defeating the St. Louis Cardinals 30–14 in the NFC divisional playoff game, followed by a 14–10 win over the Los Angeles Rams to claim their second consecutive NFC championship. They then lost 16–6 to the Pittsburgh Steelers in Super Bowl IX at Tulane Stadium in New Orleans, Louisiana, becoming the first team to lose consecutive Super Bowls.

Offseason

1974 Draft

 The Vikings traded QB Bob Lee and LB Lonnie Warwick to the Atlanta Falcons in exchange for Atlanta's first-round selection (17th overall) and QB Bob Berry.
 The Vikings traded LB Carl Gersbach and RB Clinton Jones to the San Diego Chargers in exchange for San Diego's second-round selection and the third-round selection they received from the Green Bay Packers (29th and 64th overall). 
 The Vikings traded TE Bob Brown to the New Orleans Saints in exchange for New Orleans' fourth-round selection (86th overall) and 1973 sixth-round selection.
 The Vikings traded their fourth-round selection (103rd overall) to the Cincinnati Bengals in exchange for OG Steve Lawson.
 The Vikings traded WR Gene Washington to the Denver Broncos in exchange for Denver's fifth-round selection (120th overall) and WR Rod Sherman.
 The Vikings traded their fifth-round selection (129th overall) to the Baltimore Colts in exchange for DB Charlie Stukes.
 The Vikings traded DB Charlie Stukes to the Los Angeles Rams in exchange for Los Angeles' fifth-round selection (128th overall).
 The Vikings traded the fifth-round selection they received from the Los Angeles Rams (128th overall) to the Philadelphia Eagles in exchange for LB Ron Porter.

Roster

Preseason

Regular season

Schedule

Game summaries

Week 1: at Green Bay Packers

Week 2: at Detroit Lions

Week 3: vs. Chicago Bears

Week 4: at Dallas Cowboys

Week 5: vs. Houston Oilers

Week 6: vs. Detroit Lions

Week 7: vs. New England Patriots

Week 8: at Chicago Bears

Week 9: at St. Louis Cardinals

Week 10: vs. Green Bay Packers

Week 11: at Los Angeles Rams

Week 12: vs. New Orleans Saints

Week 13: vs. Atlanta Falcons

Week 14: at Kansas City Chiefs

Standings

Playoffs

Schedule

Game summaries

NFC Divisional Playoff: vs. St. Louis Cardinals

Aided by the Cardinals' turnovers, the Vikings scored 16 points in less than 7 minutes in the third quarter. On their first possession of the game, St. Louis drove to the Vikings 35-yard line, but lost the ball on a failed 4th-and-1 conversion attempt. St. Louis eventually got onto the scoreboard first with quarterback Jim Hart's 13-yard touchdown pass to receiver Earl Thomas, but Minnesota countered when quarterback Fran Tarkenton completed a 16-yard touchdown pass to John Gilliam. The 7–7 tie would last till the end of the half. The Cardinals had a chance to take the lead with a 56-yard drive to the Vikings 6-yard line, but Jim Bakken missed a 23-yard field goal attempt as time expired.

On the third play of the second half, Vikings defensive back Jeff Wright intercepted a pass from Hart and returned it 18 yards to set up Fred Cox's 37-yard field goal, giving his team a 10–7 lead. Exactly 60 seconds later, on the Cardinals' ensuing drive, Terry Metcalf lost a fumble while being leveled by Vikings linemen Alan Page and Carl Eller. Cornerback Nate Wright picked up the loose ball and returned it 20 yards for a touchdown that increased Minnesota's lead to 17–7. A few minutes later, Tarkenton finished off a 16-point quarter with a 38-yard touchdown pass to Gilliam. In the fourth quarter, Vikings running back Chuck Foreman, who finished the game with 114 rushing yards and 5 receptions for 54 yards, recorded a 4-yard touchdown run to give Minnesota a 30–7 lead. By the time Metcalf rushed for an 11-yard fourth-quarter touchdown, the game was already out of reach for the Cardinals.

NFC Championship Game: vs. Los Angeles Rams

On an unusually balmy day for December in Minnesota, the Vikings were able to hold onto the ball for the final 5:37 of the game to preserve a 14–10 victory. After a scoreless first quarter, Minnesota quarterback Fran Tarkenton threw a 29-yard touchdown to Jim Lash. Rams kicker David Ray later added a 27-yard field goal to cut the lead to 7–3 before halftime. In the third quarter, Los Angeles advanced the ball from their own 1-yard line to the Minnesota 1-yard line. The big play on the drive was a 73-yard pass play to Harold Jackson, who was finally pushed out of bounds at the Vikings 2 by safety Jeff Wright. With the ball inside the one-yard line, Rams guard Tom Mack was controversially called for illegal procedure (replays showed Mack did not move). Moved back to the six-yard line, the Rams were forced to pass for a touchdown on third down but the pass was deflected and Vikings linebacker Wally Hilgenberg intercepted the ball in the end zone for a touchback. Minnesota then went on a 15-play drive that took almost eight minutes off the clock to score on Dave Osborn's 4-yard touchdown run. With 7:15 left to play in the game, the Rams then cut the deficit to 14–10 with Harold Jackson's 44-yard touchdown reception. Then after forcing the Vikings to punt, Los Angeles drove to the Minnesota 45-yard line. But a third down sack forced the Rams to punt again and the Vikings kept the ball to run out the clock.

Super Bowl IX: vs. Pittsburgh Steelers

Statistics

Team leaders

League rankings

References

Minnesota Vikings seasons
National Football Conference championship seasons
Minnesota
NFC Central championship seasons
Minnesota Vikings